Bassarona teuta, the banded marquis, is a species of nymphalid butterfly.

This species is placed by some authors in the genus Euthalia, as Bassarona may be considered only a subgenus.

Subspecies
B. t. teuta (Assam to Thailand)
B. t. goodrichi (Distant, 1886) (southern Thailand, Peninsular Malaya, Pulau Tioman)
B. t. affinis Lathy, 1900 (Siam)
B. t. rayana (Morishita, 1968) (Langkawi)
B. t. tiomanica Eliot, 1978 (Pulau Tioman)
B. t. teutoides (Moore, 1877) (Andamans)
B. t. gupta (de Nicéville, 1886) (southern Burma)
B. t. eurus (de Nicéville, 1894) (Sumatra)
B. t. yapana Fruhstorfer (Batu Island)
B. t. externa (de Nicéville, 1894) (Nias)
B. t. eion (de Nicéville, 1894) (Java)
B. t. veyana Fruhstorfer (Flores)
B. t. bellata (Druce, 1873) (Borneo)
B. t. ira (Moore, 1896) (Burma)
B. t. salpona (Fruhstorfer, 1909) (Natuna Island)
B. t. eson (de Nicéville, 1894) (Palawan)

Description
The upperside of the wings is dark brown, with a discal band composed of a continuous series of cream-colored spots. A small spot is present near the apex of the forewings. The underside of the wings is pale brown. Females are quite similar but larger and much paler, with a pale bluish-white discal band.

Range
This species can be found in Assam, Myanmar, Malaya, Thailand, Pulau Tioman, Langkawi, Andamans, Java, Sumatra, Borneo, Batu Islands, Nias, Flores, Natuna Islands and Palawan.

Gallery

References

 "Euthalia teuta gupta (de Niceville, 1886)" at A Check List of Butterflies in Indo-China

Bassarona
Butterflies of Asia
Butterflies of Indochina
Butterflies of Indonesia
Butterflies of Java
Butterflies of Malaysia
Butterflies of Singapore
Lepidoptera of Thailand
Butterflies described in 1848
Taxa named by Henry Doubleday